was a Japanese singer from Tokyo, Japan. She graduated from the Tokyo National University of Fine Arts and Music and both composed and sang not only classic but also pop and world music. She was also friends with well-known video game composer Yasunori Mitsuda and had collaborated with him on some of his works. She died on August 4, 2008 at age 43 after being hospitalized as the result of liver cancer.

Discography
Wāzu Wāsu no Bōken, Released May 17, 1996
Ao ni Sasageru, Released in 1997
Prayer, Released April 25, 2001
Animage, Released November 22, 2001
Animage 2, Released March 2, 2002
Kirite, Released May 18, 2005
Madoromi no Rinne, Released June 7, 2006
Soma Bringer, Released February 28, 2008
Kaze no Michi e, Released December 17, 2008
Himawari, Released December 24, 2008
Oriental Green, Released August 26, 2009
And she also sang the song "Almateria" from the anime and game Tales of Symphonia as well as tracks for Aria (see List of Aria soundtracks)

References

External links
Official website 

Deaths from liver cancer
1965 births
2008 deaths
Deaths from cancer in Japan
Singers from Tokyo
20th-century Japanese women singers
20th-century Japanese singers